The Royal Agricultural Society of England (RASE) is a learned society that promotes the scientific development of English agriculture. It was established in 1838 with the motto "Practice with Science" and received its Royal Charter from Queen Victoria in 1840. The RASE is based in Stoneleigh Park, Warwickshire.

Shows
From its early days the society has held regular exhibitions around the country (called the Royal Show). The show was held in Stoneleigh Park (previously known as the National Agricultural Centre or NAC) near Stoneleigh in Warwickshire. An early venue for the show was at Park Royal, in north-west London.

The last Royal Show took place in 2009.  Since then, the Society has concentrated on transfer of scientific knowledge to agricultural practitioners.

Journal
The first editor of the Journal of the Royal Agricultural Society of England, founded in 1854, was Philip Pusey, who had also been prominent in founding the society. After his death in 1855, the editing passed to H. S. Thompson, Sir Thomas Dyke Acland, 11th Baronet and Chandos Wren-Hoskyns. It has been published electronically since 2003.

Awards
The society makes a number of regular awards.

Bledisloe Gold Medal for Landowners, instituted in 1958 by Viscount Bledisloe, is awarded for showing outstanding achievement in the successful land management and development of an English agricultural estate.

Recipients include:

The National Agricultural Award, originally established in 1964 as the Massey Ferguson National Agricultural Award and adopted by the society in 1999, is presented to recognise outstanding contributions to the advancement of agriculture in the United Kingdom.

The Research Medal for Research Work of Benefit to Agriculture, introduced in 1954, recognises research work of outstanding merit, carried out in the United Kingdom of benefit to agriculture. The award is offered annually to people engaged in active research and is accompanied by a prize of 300 guineas.

The Technology Award recognises groups working in a commercial environment, which have applied scientific advance into technology through the development of a product or process. The medal is accompanied by a prize of 300 guineas (£315 sterling).

See also

 List of agriculture awards

References

Bibliography

External links
RASE

Organizations established in 1838
Scientific societies based in the United Kingdom
1838 establishments in England
Organisations based in England with royal patronage
Agricultural organisations based in England